is a JR West Sanyō Main Line and Hakubi Line railway station located in 1-1 1-chōme, Achi, Kurashiki, Okayama Prefecture, Japan. All Sanyō Main Line and Hakubi Line express and limited express trains stop at this station. The Mizushima Coastal Railway Kurashiki-shi Station is near the station.

History
1891-04-25: Kurashiki Station opens as a station on the San'yō Railway
1906-12-01: Kurashiki station is nationalized
1987-04-01: Japanese National Railways is privatized, and Kurashiki Station becomes a JR West station
Spring 2007: Automatic ticket gates will be installed and begin being used
Summer 2007: The ICOCA card was scheduled to be accepted

Station building and platforms

Kurashiki Station features both side- and island-style platform capable of handling several lines simultaneously. Each platform has an upper (上り) and lower end (下り) of the platform.

Facilities located within the station building include the LeBlanc department store, the Hotel Kurashiki, the Nippon Travel Agency, McDonald's, and ATMs for Chugoku Bank and Tomato Bank.

Environs

South entrance
At the south entrance to Kurashiki Station is Kurashiki-shi Station, operated by Mizushima Coastal Railway as a station on the Mizushima Main Line. Chayamachi Station, which services the Uno and Honshibasan Lines (including the Seto Ōhashi Line) is accessible via a 22-minute bus ride operated by Shimotsui Electric Railway.
Ōhara Art Museum
Kurashiki Bikan Area
Kurashiki Station South Entrance Toyoko Inn
Kurashiki City Plaza East Building
Kurashiki City Plaza West Building
Mizuho Bank
Tenmaya department store
Japan Postal savings ATM
Marunaka Kurashiki Station store (formerly Daiei Kurashiki)
Kurashiki Post Office and Kurashiki Japan Post Main Office
Kagawa Bank
Ryobi Sightseeing Bus Company, Kurashiki Office
Jumbo JJ Kurashiki Station Store (pachinko)
Mizushima Taxi

North entrance
Outside the north entrance was Kurashiki Tivoli Park, a popular amusement park, closed in 2008.
Kohnan Kurashiki Tivoli Park Store (home center)
Kurashiki Kotobuki-chō Post Office
Kurashiki Suishō High School
Kurashiki Municipal Higashi Junior High School

Highway access
 Japan National Route 429 (formerly Route 2)
 Okayama Prefectural Route 24 (Kurashiki-Kiyone Route)

Connecting lines
All lines are JR West lines. 
Sanyō Main Line
Express (Sun Liner)
Okayama Station — Kurashiki Station — Shin-Kurashiki Station
Local (becomes an express west of Saijō)
Nakashō Station — Kurashiki Station — Nishiachi Station
Hakubi Line
Sleeping Limited Expeess (Sunrise Izumo)
(Okayama Station) — Kurashiki Station — Bitchu-Takahashi Station
Local
(Nakashō Station) — Kurashiki Station — Kiyone Station

External links

  

Hakubi Line
Railway stations in Okayama Prefecture
Railway stations in Japan opened in 1891
Kurashiki